Andrew Thorpe (born 15 September 1960) is an English former footballer who played as a defender in the Football League for Stockport County, Tranmere Rovers and Doncaster Rovers. He holds the title of record appearance maker for Stockport County, with 489 league appearances, and 555 in all competitions.

Thorpe made his Stockport debut as a 17-year-old in 1978 and went on to make 380 appearances before leaving for Tranmere Rovers before the 1986–87 season. After 18 months he returned to County where he made a further 175 appearances. His last game for the club was against Peterborough United in the 1992 Football League Trophy final at Wembley, before being released at the end of the season. He went on to play in Australia and for non-league club Chorley, before returning to the Football League at the age of 37 to play twice for Doncaster Rovers on a non-contract basis, after which he went back to Chorley.

He is currently the physio at Rochdale A.F.C.

References

Living people
1961 births
Footballers from Stockport
English footballers
Association football defenders
Stockport County F.C. players
Tranmere Rovers F.C. players
Chorley F.C. players
Doncaster Rovers F.C. players
English Football League players
Rochdale A.F.C. non-playing staff